Jean de la Trémoille is the name of:

Jean de la Trémoille (1377–1449),  Grand Master and Grand Chamberlain to the dukes of Burgundy John the Fearless and Philip the Good
Jean Bretagne Charles de La Trémoille (1737–1792), duke of Thouars, married a daughter of Philip Joseph, Prince of Salm-Kyrburg